Lion Rock is a hill in Hong Kong.

Lion Rock or variant, may also refer to:

Lion Rock (California), a summit in Tulare County, California

Lion Rock (New Zealand), a prominent landmark at Piha
Sigiriya, a site in Sri Lanka
Lionrock (star), a star in the constellation Aquarius
Lionrock, a British big beat music group
Typhoon Lionrock, a list of storms with this name

See also

 Lion (disambiguation)
 Rock (disambiguation)